Epiphyllum grandilobum is an epiphytic species of cactus native to Costa Rica, Nicaragua, Panama. This species occurs in elevations of 20 to 1100 m in continuously declining forest habitats, which are threatened by housing and urban areas, tourism and recreational areas, in addition to annual and perennial non-timber crops. The populations are severely fragmented. International trade is restricted to the terms of CITES appendix II, in oder to prevent poaching of wild populations. One source suggests the species is also found in Guatemala. The specific epithet grandilobum, meaning "big-lobed", refers to the unusually large lobes of the phyllocladia.

References

External links

Night-blooming plants
grandilobum
Flora of Nicaragua
Flora of Costa Rica
Flora of Panama
Epiphytes
Cacti of North America